Dendrobium litorale, commonly known as the coastal shaggy orchid, is an epiphytic orchid in the family Orchidaceae. It has a very short rhizome with crowded, slender stems with most of the leaves in the lower half. The leaves are flattened and pointed, the flowers small and pale greenish cream-coloured. It occurs on islands in the Torres Strait and in New Guinea.

Description 
The side lobes are blunt and the middle lobe has a central notch. Flowering occurs in April and July.

Taxonomy and naming
Dendrobium litorale was first formally described in 1912 by Rudolf Schlechter and the description was published in Repertorium Specierum Novarum Regni Vegetabilis Beihefte.
The specific epithet (litorale) is a Latin word meaning "of the seashore".

Distribution and habitat
The coastal shaggy orchid grows on trees in lowland rainforest and beach scrub on Dauan Island in the Torres Strait and in New Guinea.

References

litorale
Orchids of Queensland
Orchids of New Guinea
Plants described in 1912